The Permanent Mission of Armenia to the CSTO is the diplomatic mission of Armenia to the Collective Security Treaty Organization (CSTO). It is based in Moscow, Russia.

History 
Armenia was a founding member of the CSTO military alliance, which was established in 1994. The Permanent Mission of Armenia to the CSTO was founded on 16 January 2012 by Presidential decree. The primary goals of the mission is to further facilitate the development of relations and cooperation between Armenia, the CSTO, and its members. Other objectives include, fostering military-technical and military-economic cooperation between CSTO member states, planning joint activities and events, and deepening multilateral ties.

Permanent Representative 
As of November 2018, Ambassador Viktor Biyagov is the current Head of the Permanent Mission of Armenia to the CSTO. Meanwhile, Mher Shirinyan has been appointed Representative of the Armed Forces of Armenia at the Mission of Armenia to the CSTO.

See also 
 Foreign relations of Armenia
 List of diplomatic missions of Armenia

References

External links 
 Official website
 Permanent Mission of Armenia to the CSTO on Facebook

Diplomatic missions in Russia
CSTO